The following is an episode list for the Kids' WB and Cartoon Network animated television series The Batman, starring the titular character. The series premiered on September 11, 2004, and ended on March 8, 2008, with a total of 65 episodes being produced and aired over the series' three-and-a-half-year run; each season comprised 13 episodes.

All five seasons are available on DVD. A direct-to-DVD movie titled The Batman vs. Dracula, based on the series, was released in on October 18, 2005, and made its television debut on Cartoon Network's Toonami block on October 22, 2005. There is also a spin-off comic book series, The Batman Strikes!, published by DC Comics which is set in the same continuity and style of The Batman.

Series overview

Episodes

Season 1 (2004–05)

Season 2 (2005)

Season 3 (2005–06)

Season 4 (2006–07)

Season 5 (2007–08)

Movie (2005)
The 2005 direct-to-video feature film The Batman vs. Dracula was released after four episodes of the third season had aired. An intended sequel based on Batman: Hush was in pre-production before the project was cancelled. The movie was released to DVD on October 18, 2005, and made its television debut on Cartoon Network's Toonami block on October 22, 2005. It was released on DVD as a tie-in with the live-action Batman Begins.

References

Specific

General

External links 
Batman at http://www.worldsfinestonline.com/
 

Episodes: The Batman
Batman, The
Batman, The
Batman, The
Batman, The
Episodes